Andrew Jackson Fundamental Magnet High School, commonly nicknamed "A.J.", "Andrew Jackson", or "Andrew Jackson High School", was a public magnet high school in Chalmette in the area of St. Bernard Parish, Louisiana, United States. It is a part of St. Bernard Parish Public Schools. Andrew Jackson was turned into an elementary school in 2010 then later into a middle school teaching grades 6-8. Currently still a middle school.

History
Andrew Jackson High School opened as an all-girls school in the fall of 1966, along with P.G.T. Beauregard High School, to meet the demands of more classrooms to house the growing population of St. Bernard Parish, the same year that both Chalmette High School and St. Bernard High School opened as all-boy schools. The solution to the problem of having four co-ed high schools was to segregate by sex. This would cut costs drastically since the parish would only have to build and maintain two stadiums instead of four. Andrew Jackson High School and P.G.T. Beauregard High School served girls for the next twenty two years, and they became the "sister" schools to Chalmette and St. Bernard respectively.

The decision to go back to co-ed status in 1989 brought about a mild decline in the school. More students were choosing to attend Andrew Jackson, a magnet school that served the entire parish, rather than just the upper end. Unlike like Chalmette and St. Bernard high schools, Andrew Jackson required an entrance examination, interview, or audition. Like other magnet schools, Andrew Jackson selected all students who applied or used a lottery system, or a system combining some elements of competitive entrance and a lottery.

Pre-Katrina (1965-2005)
Andrew Jackson Fundamental Magnet High School formerly held a student capacity of about 1,075 students. The last graduating class before Hurricane Katrina took place at the Frederick J. Sigur Civic Center on May 19, 2005.

Athletics 
Unlike Chalmette and St. Bernard high schools, Andrew Jackson focused more on academics than athletics, with the exception of the few listed below:
 Cross Country
 Golf
 Soccer
 Swim Team
 Tennis
 Volleyball
 Wrestling
 Cheerleading

Post-Katrina (2006-present)
Andrew Jackson was severely damaged by Hurricane Katrina on August 29, 2005, and was closed during the 2005-2006 school year where the St. Bernard Unified School took place at the Chalmette High School in November of that year. The last official graduating ceremony for the class of 2006 took place at the Smoothie King Center in May 2006, along with Chalmette High School and St. Bernard High School to coincide with the time that was lost during the 2005-2006 school year.

Plans of rebuilding another high school were blacklisted when the St. Bernard Parish School Board decided to open Chalmette High School as the base of the entire St. Bernard Parish community, that expanded its campus on the previous Lacoste Elementary School campus for the 9th Grade Academy building that opened in 2009. If an additional high school is needed in the future because of enrollment, both Andrew Jackson and St. Bernard High Schools would be refurbished and operational for necessary expansion.

Andrew Jackson Elementary School
The school opened as Andrew Jackson Elementary School for the 2006-2007 school year to balance the student capacity between both the Chalmette High School and Andrew Jackson campuses until more schools in the parish were opened again. Andrew Jackson housed grades Pre-K to 5th grade while Chalmette High School housed grades 6th grade to 12th grade.

Andrew Jackson Middle School
The school opened as Andrew Jackson Middle School for the 2010-2011 school year, and remains as the latter to this day. The elementary students who previously attended Andrew Jackson registered and transferred to the new Chalmette Elementary School (previously Chalmette Middle School) and Arabi Elementary School campuses.

Public middle schools in Louisiana
Schools in St. Bernard Parish, Louisiana